The Air Defense Artillery Branch is the branch of the United States Army that specializes in anti-aircraft weapons (such as surface to air missiles). In the U.S. Army, these groups are composed of mainly air defense systems such as the Patriot Missile System, Terminal High Altitude Area Defense (THAAD), and the Avenger Air Defense system which fires the FIM-92 Stinger missile.

The Air Defense Artillery branch descended from Anti-Aircraft Artillery (part of the U.S. Army Coast Artillery Corps until 1950, then part of the Artillery Branch) into a separate branch on 20 June 1968. On 1 December 1968, the ADA branch was authorized to wear modified Artillery insignia, crossed field guns with missile.  The Branch Motto, "First To Fire", was adopted in 1986 by the attendees of the ADA Commanders' Conference at Fort Bliss. The motto refers to a speech given by General Jonathan Wainwright to veterans of the 200th Coast Artillery (Antiaircraft) stating they were the 'First to Fire' in World War II against the Empire of Japan.

Mission
According to the Army's Field Manual 3-01, the mission of Air Defense Artillery is "to protect the force and selected geopolitical assets from aerial attack, missile attack, and surveillance."

History
On 10 October 1917 an Antiaircraft Service in the American Expeditionary Force (AEF) was created at Arnouville-Les-Gonesse where an antiaircraft school was established. The antiaircraft units were organized as serially numbered battalions during the war, as follows:
 1st Antiaircraft Battalion through the 10th Antiaircraft Battalion (redesignated as numbered antiaircraft sectors in November 1918, all demobilized by January 1919)
 1st AA Machine Gun Battalion through the 6th AA Machine Gun Battalion.  These units were organized by Col. James A. Shipton and were demobilized January–May 1919.

Coast Artillery role

The National Defense Act of 1920 formally assigned the air defense mission to the Coast Artillery Corps, and 4 battalions were organized in 1921. In 1924, under a major reorganization of the Coast Artillery, the battalions were reorganized as regiments. There were also 42 Organized Reserve antiaircraft regiments in 8 brigades; however, many of the Reserve units only had a small number of personnel assigned, and many were demobilized without activation during World War II.
 (6) Regular Army anti-aircraft regiments
 60th Coast Artillery (AA)
 61st Coast Artillery (AA)
 62nd Coast Artillery (AA)
 63rd Coast Artillery (AA)
 64th Coast Artillery (AA)
 65th Coast Artillery (AA)
 (13) National Guard AA regiments
 197th Coast Artillery (AA) N.H.
 198th Coast Artillery (AA) DE.
 200th Coast Artillery (AA) N.M.
 202nd Coast Artillery (AA) IL.
 203rd Coast Artillery (AA) MO.
 206th Coast Artillery (AA) AR.
 207th Coast Artillery (AA) N.Y.
 211th Coast Artillery (AA) MA.
 212th Coast Artillery (AA) N.Y.
 213th Coast Artillery (AA) PA.
 214th Coast Artillery (AA) GA. 
 251st Coast Artillery (AA) CA.
 369th Coast Artillery (AA) N.Y.

Expansion
In 1938 there were only six Regular Army and thirteen National Guard regiments, but by 1941 this had been expanded to 37 total regiments. In November 1942, 781 battalions were authorized. However, this number was pared down to 331 battalions by the end of the war. By late 1944 the regiments had been broken up into battalions and 144 "Antiaircraft Artillery Groups" had been activated; some of these existed only briefly.

The serially-numbered battalions in late World War II included the following types:
 Antiaircraft Artillery Battalion
 Antiaircraft Artillery Automatic Weapons Battalion
 Antiaircraft Artillery Gun Battalion
 Antiaircraft Artillery Searchlight Battalion
 Barrage Balloon Battalion
and in the 1950s:
 Antiaircraft Artillery Missile Battalion.

On 9 March 1942 Antiaircraft Command was established in Washington D.C. and 1944 the AAA school was moved to Fort Bliss.

Army Air Defense Command
Army Air Defense Command ran from 1957 to 1974.

In 1991 the Patriot missile was heavily utilized during the Gulf War. After this short skirmish ended Air Defense has not been involved in any significant combat actions due to lack of enemy air assets and/or missile technology.

In 2010 the United States Army Air Defense Artillery School was moved from Fort Bliss to Fort Sill.

Air Defense Artillery Units 
The following lists all units that make up the Army's Air Defense Artillery Branch.

Army Air and Missile Defense Commands

Air Defense Artillery Brigades

Army Battalions

Army Batteries

National Guard Battalions

Shipton award 
The Shipton Award is named for Brigadier General James A. Shipton, who is acknowledged as the Air Defense Artillery Branch's founding father. Shipton felt that the mission of antiaircraft defense was not to down enemy aircraft, but instead to protect maneuver forces on the ground: "The purpose of anti-aviation defense is to protect our forces and establishments from hostile attack and observation from the air by keeping enemy airplanes [sic] at a distance." The Shipton Award recognizes an Air Defense Artillery professionals for outstanding performance individual thought, innovation, and contributions that result in significant contributions or enhances Air Defense Artillery's warfighting capabilities, morale, readiness, and maintenance.

See also 
 Oozlefinch
 Army Air Defense Command (United States) – more detail 1950–1974
 Anti-Aircraft Command – British equivalent 1939–1955

References 

 Antiaircraft Artillery Battalions of the U.S. Army (Volumes 1,2) 1991 by James A. Sawicki 
 History of the 1st AA Battalion, Coast Artillery Corps in World War I
 
Lieutenant Colonel Roy S. Barnard (The History of ARADCOM Volume I, The Gun Era:1950-1955)
LTC Barnard and Berle K. Hufford, ARADCOM Annual Reports from 1966-1973.
  
Lieutenant Colonel Timothy Osato, Militia Missilemen: The Army National Guard in Air Defense - 1951 - 1967 (1968)
 
Osato and Mrs. Sherryl Straup, ARADCOM's Florida Defenses in the Aftermath of the Cuban Missile Crisis: 1963-1968 (1968)

External links
 U.S. Army Air Defense Artillery lineage website
 ADA museum at Fort Sill
 The Fort MacArthur Museum Association: Air Defense Units in LA – 47th Brigade at Fort McArthur, Calif.
some details on U.S. Army Air Defense Command (ARADCOM)

Branches of the United States Army
Military units and formations established in 1968
Air defense artillery units of the United States Army
1968 establishments in the United States